Georges Vandevoorde (30 April 1878 – 17 June 1964) was a Belgian sculptor. His work was part of the sculpture event in the art competition at the 1936 Summer Olympics.

References

1878 births
1964 deaths
20th-century Belgian sculptors
20th-century male artists
Belgian sculptors
Olympic competitors in art competitions
People from Kortrijk